Below is the list of characters in Chihayafuru, a manga series, set in the world of competitive karuta, by Yuki Suetsugu whose story has been adapted into novels, animated series and live action films.

Main characters

 Portrayed by: Suzu Hirose,  (young)
A determined high school girl who was inspired by Arata in elementary school to play karuta and to dream of becoming the "Queen" of karuta. She begins a karuta club at her high school with Taichi. She is first introduced to competitive karuta by her childhood friend, Arata. Karuta has remained as Chihaya's passion despite being separated from Arata. She has an exceptional hearing ability that gives her an advantage in playing karuta. While she is beautiful, she is considered too weird, her classmates referring to her as a "beauty in vain". She is crazy about karuta (her friends calls her "karuta baka"), to the point that she can be oblivious to other people's feelings. Chihaya is the captain of Mizusawa Karuta Club. She works very hard at improving her karuta skills, and reaches Class A near the beginning of the series. She is a strong, passionate person who loves karuta and is dedicated to her teammates and friends. Chihaya shares a strong bond of trust and friendship with Taichi and appreciates his skill in leading the club, though oblivious towards his feelings for her. Eventually both Arata and Taichi confess that they have feelings for her and though she admitted to herself rather ardently that she will “always love Karuta and Arata” she does yet know how she feels for Taichi. However, she rejects Taichi’s confession saying “gomen” (sorry) and he decides to quit the Karuta club. This leaves a massive hole in both their dynamics as team (they are missing a president) and in Chihaya’s heart. She feels immense guilt for unintentionally hurting him which forces her to almost quit Kaurta. However she powers through without him leading to the high-school tournament. There she finally plays the match with Arata and she wins against him. Thereby her initial goal of being someone worthy to “sit in front of Arata” before she can be with him is no longer an obstacle. Sometime before the Meijin and Queen matches, Chihaya finally responds to Arata’s confession. She tells him that she is currently focusing on being queen. He is understanding and tells her he will “try again” once he reaches Tokyo. However, during the Queen match Chihaya has some very powerful revelations about her feelings towards Taichi (who is currently avoiding watching Chihaya and Arata play). However, though it was subtly building up, like Chihaya hallucinating Taichi at omi shrine, it is not until the “Su” card is read that Chihauya finally verbalizes that Taichi has “always been there” - the person who was working hard beside her. Chihaya finally wins the title of Queen alongside Arata. However, she does not confess to either of them at that moment. It is not until arrives spring that Chihaya returns to the clubroom and confesses her feelings towards Taichi- in a simple but poignant way. In chapter 247, the final chapter of Chihayafuru, Chihaya and Taichi have started dating.

 Portrayed by: Shuhei Nomura,   (young)
A good-looking, all-rounded sportsman and Chihaya's childhood best friend. Who has a stick mother that tells him that he should stick to activities he can win at.  Taichi Mashima is an intelligent boy from a rich family who is very popular amongst the kids at their elementary school. He is almost instantly good at everything he does and is referred to in the series as a “Jack of all trades, master of none”. When Arata transfers to his class, he dislikes him immediately and starts bullying him for being “weird” and poor.  Though, later, we learn that he was doing so due to his own insecurity and because he was jealous of all the attention that was thrown at him by Chihaya (whom he had a crush on). It is when he is challenged to play Karuta against Arata that he is so terrified of losing to the eternal Meijin’s grandson and disappointing his mother who expects him to excel, that he decides to hide Arata’s glasses. Thereby securing himself a victory. However, though Arata tries to play without his glasses, he is completely unable to play at his usual level. Seeing this, Chihaya steps in to play for Arata (and for herself) and she wins against Taichi. Chihaya never suspected that Taichi was the one that hid Arata’s glasses. Eventually out of guilt, Taichi returns them to Arata, begging him not to tell Chihaya, and Arata agrees but calls him a coward. He holds onto Arata’s words for the entire series as he tries to prove to himself that he isn’t one. During the high school arc, Taichi attends the same high school as Chihaya, whom he hasn't met since middle school, but Chihaya asks if Taichi still plays Karuta. He says only casually,  but she begs him to watch her get to A class where he reluctantly decides to make a Karuta club with her. However, in part, he decided to make a club with Chihaya because it looks fun, and he saw the potential in Chihaya, so he wants to help her accomplish her dream. His primary goal is winning a match against Arata. Taichi is the president of the Mizusawa Karuta club. Throughout the two years of high school, Taichi learns how to be a team leader and also becomes close friends with everyone on the team, especially Nishida and Komano. Taichi too has grown a lot as a Karuta player, for instance, making it into A class (One of his primary hurdles at the start of the series). Taichi has an incredible memory and can remember every single card that has been read. However, this skill is a double-edged sword; due to his strong memory, occasionally it makes it difficult for him to forget placements of previous/current matches. However, despite constant bouts of bad luck, he always manages to pick himself back up and keep trying. One of his biggest weaknesses as a player is himself - he always gets into his head and has very low self-esteem, nearly always thinking the worst about himself and thinking that people also think the worst of him. Though the Mizusawa team won the national high school tournament, Taichi desperately wants to win a match against Chihaya. When he loses against her in Yoshino, he starts a downward trajectory where his grades begin to slip, and he starts participating in tournaments away from Chihaya. After learning that Arata has confessed his feelings and subsequently losing to him in a match, Taichi is at an all-time low. Chihaya does her best to make him smile, but no matter what she does it's still not enough. Taichi finally gathers his courage and confesses to Chihaya about stealing Arata’s glasses when they were kids, thereby choosing to no longer be a coward. He confessed that he loves Chihaya, and she replied sorry,  which he takes as a rejection and storms out. Taichi quits the club but decides not to give up Karuta fully. He later developed an unlikely mentor-friend relationship with Hisashi Suou- the current reigning Meijin. Suou teaches Taichi not only how to improve his hearing, but he also develops a cruel style of Karuta - one where you trick your opponents into making faults. After his rejection, Taichi avoids Chihaya at all costs. But when the high school tournament is on, and Chihaya will be playing against Arata, he decides to finally go back and watch them. It is a heartfelt reunion with the Mizusawa team. Taichi gives Arata a box of chocolates attached with a note that they will meet again in a match. To Chihaya’s delight, Taichi returns to play to become the challenger for the West. He uses his newfound skills from Suou to win the challenger matches, even winning against his sensei, Harada. At the challenger matches, he plays against Arata once again. He tries to adopt Suou’s detached Karuta, that doesn’t care about winning or losing. In the first match, Taichi is close to losing, but he finally gets a card against Arata. Arata claims that it was his card and because Taichi is trying to remain detached, and even though both of them know Taichi got it first, he lets it go. Arata feels guilty about lying about the take, so he offers Taichi anything to make up for it. Taichi tells him that the only way he can is if they are in a battle of fates, Arata will let Taichi win no matter which card is called. In the second match, because he wants to take the Chiha card from Arata more than anything, Taichi gets the upper hand; thereby rejecting Suou’s empty Karuta.  It is another battle of fates but true to his word, Arata lets Taichi take the last card, and Taichi won the second round. However, in the final match due to exhaustion and perhaps feeling like he accomplished his dream of winning against Arata, Taichi loses by 18 cards. However, Arata tells Taichi that he never saw him as a burden and thanks him for playing Karuta with him for all these years even though he wasn't as skilled as him. They both hug as Chihaya cries bitter tears for Taichi’s loss.  Taichi does not want to watch Arata and Chihaya play in their Meijin and Queen matches in the Omi Jingu, because he thinks it doesn’t matter to either of them if he’s there or not. However, he does bring Suou’s family out to watch him which forces him to travel to Omi Jingu. Eventually, he does decide to go and watch Chihaya, and he witnesses both Arata and Chihaya take the Chiha card. This inspires him to start practicing his swings outside in the hallway. Sumire convinces Taichi to watch as both Chihaya and Arata win the title of Meijin and Queen.  He is happy for his friends achieving their dreams, however, he still feels like he is the one who is being left behind, and he also thinks that Chihaya and Arata make a great pair believing that the two of them would end up together. His arc culminates with him finally challenging Arata the next year, and both Chihaya and Arata race down the stairs to hug him. At the end of the story, Taichi decides to move to Kyoto for a fresh start, and though Chihaya is sad that he is moving, He tells her that they will always meet again through Karuta. Thereby, he still promised her that they would continue to be friends even though she did not love him back. However, realizing this is not enough, Chihaya confesses that she is in love with him. At first, he is bewildered, but then he accepts, in chapter 247 of Chihayafuru, Chihaya and Taichi have started dating. 

 Portrayed by: Mackenyu,  (young)
Arata Wataya was a transfer student to Chihaya's elementary school, grandchild of an eternal master karuta player, Arata inspires Chihaya to take up karuta. He has difficulty fitting in at Chihaya's elementary school because of his Fukui dialect and passion for karuta, but Chihaya befriends him.  His dream is to become a karuta Meijin. After graduating elementary school, he returns to Fukui to care for his grandfather. After returning to Fukui, he quits karuta because his grandfather died while Arata was competing in a karuta tournament to rise to A-rank. However, after Chihaya and Taichi visit him in Fukui, he regains his resolve to play competitive karuta again. He has beaten "The Queen" Shinobu Wakamiya and is aiming to beat "Master" Hishashi Suo to claim the position of "Master". Arata cherishes his friendship with both Chihaya and Taichi, albeit romantically to Chihaya. Later in the manga, Arata confesses his love to Chihaya, also informing her of his move back to Tokyo. Arata then excuses himself, leaving Chihaya flustered and speechless.

Mizusawa High School Karuta Club

 Portrayed by: Mone Kamishiraishi
A girl with a taste for the classics, Kanade is a quiet girl who works in a kimono store and loves all kinds of traditional clothing. She is quite knowledgeable about the true meanings behind the One Hundred Poems and joins the karuta club on the condition that they start wearing hakama. Her dream is to become an official reader and be able to read for Chihaya's Queen match. She knows that Taichi has feelings for Chihaya and tells him to do his best.

 Portrayed by: Yuma Yamoto
A rather tubby boy who is reluctantly often called  by Chihaya. Once a top karuta player who had previously played against Chihaya, Arata and Taichi in an elementary school tournament, Yūsei quit karuta after suffering a defeat against Arata and took up tennis as a refuge. However, Chihaya manages to remind him how he used to play for fun and he ends up joining the karuta club. While he is talented in karuta, focusing on a defensive style, he gets shaken up really easily.

 Portrayed by: Yuki Morinaga
An intelligent boy in Chihaya's class who is second only to Taichi in test scores. Often tied to his desk and anti-social, he feels that nothing is worth doing unless it makes you smarter. However, Chihaya and Taichi help to convince him that karuta involves a lot of strategy and he joins the club. As the progress within the series, Tsutomu has improved social skill to his teammates, especially Kanade. He is now the karuta strategist of the team, taking down notes in every game.

Played by: Mio Yuki
A girl who joins the Karuta Club at the start of Chihaya's second year.  Having been dumped by her boyfriend on the first day of school, she becomes desperate to find a new boyfriend and immediately develops a crush on Taichi, which he does not return.  Sumire initially joins the club in order to get close to Taichi, but after she inadvertently told that to the club members, she was convinced by Kanade to stay and devote herself to karuta. Her feelings for Taichi become genuine as she spends more time around him. She even stands up to Taichi's mother, who wanted to stop him from competing in a karuta tournament. Although she is new to the game, she tends to show strong emotions when reading poems.

Played by: Hayato Sano
A boy who joins the Karuta Club at the start of Chihaya's second year.  He is originally from Hokkaido and is a master at playing second verse karuta using two hands.  He joins the club to learn how to play first verse karuta. He comes from a family who is attracted to pretty people, and has three younger brothers who admire him. At the beginning, he would sometimes do sneaky acts (such as changing the order of his teammates before games) so that he could show off his skills in front of his brothers. He and his brothers admire Chihaya for both her playing skills and beauty, and several instances show that he has a small crush on Chihaya.

 Portrayed by: Miyuki Matsuda
Nicknamed "Empress", she is the advisor of the Karuta Club and also the homeroom teacher of Ayase and Tsutomu. Although initially unreceptive to Karuta, she gradually warms up when she witness how serious the club members are playing Karuta.

Meijin and Queen

 Portrayed by: Mayu Matsuoka
The primary antagonist of the Chihayafuru series.
The current Queen of Karuta, the national champion of the women's division, she is also the youngest Queen in history. When she was younger there was this girl that was a close Karuta friend, but because Shinobu was very skilled in Karuta she wasn't allowed to play Karuta with kids her age. She was always isolated from others.

The current Meijin of Karuta, the national champion of the men's division. He began karuta in college, and took three years to take the title of Meijin. He has since defended the title 5 times. His favourite food is sweets.

Shiranami Karuta Society

 Portrayed by: Jun Kunimura
Chairman of the Shiranami Karuta Society. Harada provides karuta instruction in Fuchū, Tokyo. In elementary school Chihaya, Taichi and Arata develop their karuta skills and form their first team under Harada's supervision. Throughout the series he is a karuta mentor as well as a confidant who teaches his pupils life lessons. An accomplished karuta competitor Harada participates at the highest levels in karuta tournaments. In the manga and the anime he is a medical doctor who runs the Harada Clinic of Internal Medicine and Paediatrics. In the live action trilogy Harada's profession is Kannushi, or Shinto priest who operates a Shinto shrine.

 Ace of the Shiranami Karuta Society. Made it to the Meijin Challenger Finals as the Eastern Representative but lost to his opponent. Currently the advisor for Homei High School Karuta Team.

 Tsukuba Akihiro's younger brothers.

Suihoku Karuta Society

 Chairman of Suihoku Karuta Society. He has a deep-seated rivalry with Hidehiro Harada.

A, one time, Queen of Karuta, who lost the title to Shinobu Wakamiya. After her defeat, Yamamoto continues her participation in competitive karuta as the strongest representative of Suihoku. At twenty-four years of age she works as a bank teller. Prior to attaining the national women's title, Yamamoto's karuta gamesmanship involved contesting decisions with opponents. As former Queen she resumes her card challenging arguments during a heated match against Chihaya, whom she defeats to progress to the next round of the Eastern Japan qualifiers. That year Yamamoto is ultimately defeated, as the national challenger, by reigning champion Shinobu Wakamiya. At Shuihoku Karuta Society, Yamamoto provides advice and guidance to up-and-coming members, such as Tomihara West High School student Setsuna Hayami.

Nagumo Karuta Society

 Chairman of Fukui Nagumo Karuta Society.

 A-Class member of Fukui Nagumo Karuta Society. Always practices with Arata.

 Member of Fukui Nagumo Karuta Society who is still in elementary school.

Myoujou Karuta Society

 Chairman of Kyoto Myojo Karuta Society, where Wakamiya Shinobu used to play at.

 Shinobu's childhood friend.

Hokuo High School

Portrayed by: Hiroya Shimizu
 

 

Portrayed by: Ryotaro Sakaguchi
 

 

 

 

 

 Advisor of Hokuo High School Karuta Club.

Fujisaki High School

 

 

 

 
 and 

 

 

 

 Advisor of the Fujisaki High School Karuta Club.

Akashi First Girls' School

 

 

 Advisor of the Karuta Club.

Shoyo High School

Yamaguchi Miyoka High School

 Advisor of the Karuta Club.

Chiba International School of Information Sciences

Takechi High School

Homei High School

Tomihara West High School

Karuta club member and Japanese calligraphy student, admirer of Ogata Kōrin.
Member of Suihoku Karuta Society, who also participates in individual karuta tournaments outside the high school setting.

Shuryukan High School

Fukui West High School

Jinnan Academy

 Advisor of Karuta Club.

Other competitors

Played by: Masane Tsukayama
Arata's grandfather, who died before the beginning of the series. He was an excellent karuta player in the past, who gave Arata life lessons whenever he is at a disadvantage.

 1st year Meijin Challenger.

 Chihaya's opponent during the match that earned Chihaya her promotion to class A.

 Maiden name Chihara. Former Queen.

Readers

 1 out of 7 Certified Readers. 7 Dan.

Voiced by: Javier Lopez (English)
 Reader of the CD used for Practice. 7 Dan.

Karuta Society Committee Members

 National Society Chairman. 10 Dan.

 High School Competitor Disciplinary Committee Chair. 6 Dan.

Family members

Portrayed by: Alice Hirose
Chihaya's big sister, who works as a model. She has doubts about her modeling career; but she gets determined again after watching her sister focus on Karuta all the time.

 Chitose and Chihaya's mother.

 Chitose and Chihaya's dad.

 Taichi's mother.

 Taichi's sister.

 Kanade's mother.

 Arata's mother.

 Arata's dad.

 Shinobu's mother.

 Kyoto Diet representative.

Yusei's elder sister.

Other characters from Misuzawa High School

Other characters

 Arata's neighbour in Fukui.

 Manager of the bookstore where Arata work part-time.

 He is a fan of Megumu Osaka.

References

External links
 
Chihayafuru at Kodansha Comics
Official NTV website 

Chihayafuru